The Battle of Britain 2 is a 1992 video game published by Deadly Games.

Gameplay
The Battle of Britain 2 is a game in which the player orders squadrons from the No. 11 Group RAF to defend Britain, commanding from the war room at Uxbridge. The game uses a plotting map and a tote-board system, and the player keeps track of observer reports on potential threats from radar and the ground.

Reception
Alan Emrich reviewed the game for Computer Gaming World, and stated that "Don't miss out on The Battle of Britain 2 if you want a gaming distraction that is, at once, enjoyable, pleasant, easily learned, historical and 'lite.'"

Andrew Miller from Macworld commented that "even though the graphics and sound on The Battle of Britain [2] are not spectacular, I recommend the game. What it lacks in aesthetics it makes up for in strategy, historical insight, and entertainment."

Don Crabb for the Chicago Sun-Times said that "If you like war games and simulations, or even if you have never tried one before, The Battle of Britain 2 deserves your attention. It's a superb, thinking persons computer game that proves you don't need arcade graphics to have fun playing computer games."

Reviews
PC Novice

References

1992 video games
Macintosh games